A gazetteer of place names in the United Kingdom showing each place's county, unitary authority or council area and its geographical coordinates.

 

Location names beginning with A
Location names beginning with Aa–Ak
Location names beginning with Al
Location names beginning with Am–Ar
Location names beginning with As–Az
Location names beginning with B
Location names beginning with Bab–Bal
Location names beginning with Bam–Bap
Location names beginning with Bar
Location names beginning with Bas–Baz
Location names beginning with Bea–Bem
Location names beginning with Ben–Bez
Location names beginning with Bi
Location names beginning with Bla–Blac
Location names beginning with Blad–Bly
Location names beginning with Boa–Bot
Location names beginning with Bou–Boz
Location names beginning with Bra
Location names beginning with Bre–Bri
Location names beginning with Bro–Bron
Location names beginning with Broo–Brt
Location names beginning with Bru–Bun
Location names beginning with Bur–Bz
Location names beginning with C
Location names beginning with Ca–Cap
Location names beginning with Car–Cd
Location names beginning with Ce–Chap
Location names beginning with Char–Che
Location names beginning with Chi–Ck
Location names beginning with Cl–Cn
Location names beginning with Co–Col
Location names beginning with Com–Cor
Location names beginning with Cos–Cou
Location names beginning with Cov–Coy
Location names beginning with Cra
Location names beginning with Cre–Croc
Location names beginning with Croe–Cros
Location names beginning with Crot–Croz
Location names beginning with Cru–Cu
Location names beginning with Cw–Cz
Location names beginning with D
Location names beginning with Da–Dam
Location names beginning with Dan–Ddu
Location names beginning with De–Dee
Location names beginning with Deo–Dn
Location names beginning with Do–Dor
Location names beginning with Dos–Doz
Location names beginning with Dr
Location names beginning with Ds–Dz
Location names beginning with E
Location names beginning with Ea–Eass
Location names beginning with East A–East D
Location names beginning with East E–East L
Location names beginning with East M–East Y
Location names beginning with Eat–Ee
Location names beginning with Ef–El
Location names beginning with Em–Ez
Location names beginning with F
Location names beginning with Fa–Fe
Location names beginning with Ff–Fn
Location names beginning with Fo
Location names beginning with Fr–Fz
Location names beginning with G
Location names beginning with Gab–Gan
Location names beginning with Gao–Gar
Location names beginning with Gas–Gaz
Location names beginning with Ge–Gl
Location names beginning with Gm–Gq
Location names beginning with Gr–Gred
Location names beginning with Gree–Gz
Location names beginning with H
Location names beginning with Ha–Ham
Location names beginning with Han–Har
Location names beginning with Has–Hd
Location names beginning with He–Hem
Location names beginning with Hen–Hh
Location names beginning with Hi–Highr
Location names beginning with Highs–Hn
Location names beginning with Ho–Hoo
Location names beginning with Hop–Ht
Location names beginning with Hu–Hz
Location names beginning with I, J
Location names beginning with Ia–Im
Location names beginning with In–Ir
Location names beginning with Is–Ix
Location names beginning with J
Location names beginning with K
Location names beginning with Ka–Key
Location names beginning with Kib–Kin
Location names beginning with Kip–Kz
Location names beginning with L
Location names beginning with La
Location names beginning with Lea–Lei
Location names beginning with Lel–Lez
Location names beginning with Lf–Litm
Location names beginning with Litn–Liz
Location names beginning with Llae–Llane
Location names beginning with Llanf–Llann
Location names beginning with Llano–Lly
Location names beginning with Lm–Loi
Location names beginning with Lol–Lov
Location names beginning with Low–Loz
Location names beginning with Lu–Ly
Location names beginning with M
Location names beginning with Ma–Maq
Location names beginning with Mar–Md
Location names beginning with Me–Mic
Location names beginning with Mid–Mig
Location names beginning with Milb–Milk
Location names beginning with Mill
Location names beginning with Miln–Mix
Location names beginning with Mo–Mor
Location names beginning with Mos–Mz
Location names beginning with N
Location names beginning with Na–Nev
Location names beginning with New–Newl
Location names beginning with Newm–Newto
Location names beginning with Newton
Location names beginning with New T–Ney
Location names beginning with Ni–North G
Location names beginning with North H–Nz
Location names beginning with O
Location names beginning with Oa–Od
Location names beginning with Of–Old G
Location names beginning with Old H–Om
Location names beginning with On–Oz
Location names beginning with P
Location names beginning with Pab–Pap
Location names beginning with Par–Pay
Location names beginning with Pe–Pen
Location names beginning with Peo–Pn
Location names beginning with Po
Location names beginning with Pr–Pz
Location names beginning with Q
Location names beginning with Q
Location names beginning with R
Location names beginning with Ra–Ray
Location names beginning with Re–Rh
Location names beginning with Ri–Ror
Location names beginning with Ros–Rz
Location names beginning with S
Location names beginning with Saa–Sanc
Location names beginning with Sand–Say
Location names beginning with Sb–Sf
Location names beginning with Sg–Sh
Location names beginning with Si–Sm
Location names beginning with Sn–Souts
Location names beginning with South
Location names beginning with Sow–Stao
Location names beginning with Stap–St N
Location names beginning with Sto–St Q
Location names beginning with Str–Stt
Location names beginning with Stu–Sz
Location names beginning with T
Location names beginning with Ta–Tha
Location names beginning with The–Thh
Location names beginning with Thi–Thw
Location names beginning with Ti
Location names beginning with To–Tq
Location names beginning with Tr–Tre
Location names beginning with Tri–Tz
Location names beginning with U
Location names beginning with U–Uppen
Location names beginning with Upper A–Upper H
Location names beginning with Upper I–Upper W
Location names beginning with Uppi–Uz
Location names beginning with V
Location names beginning with V
Location names beginning with W
Location names beginning with Wa–Wal
Location names beginning with Wam–Way
Location names beginning with Wd–West End
Location names beginning with Weste–West L
Location names beginning with West M–Wey
Location names beginning with Wha–Whitc
Location names beginning with White
Location names beginning with Whitf–Why
Location names beginning with Wi–Win
Location names beginning with Wir–Wood
Location names beginning with Woof–Wy
Location names beginning with X–Z
Location names beginning with X–Z

See also
List of places in England
Lists of places in Wales
List of places in Scotland
List of places in Northern Ireland
Toponymy in the United Kingdom and Ireland, the study of place names
List of generic forms in place names in Ireland and the United Kingdom
United Nations Group of Experts on Geographical Names

External links
The Gazetteer of British Place Names